Ein Leben für Ungarn (A Life for Hungary) are the memoirs of Nikolaus von Horthy (also known as Miklós Horthy), Regent of Hungary. They were published in German under the name of Nikolaus von Horthy when he was exiled in Portugal after World War II.

In his memoirs, Horthy recounted personal experiences from his youth until the end of World War II. He also claimed that he tried to perform the best actions and appoint the best officials in his country, and documented what he saw as mistreatment of Hungary by some other countries in the aftermath of World War I.

References

Political autobiographies
1953 non-fiction books